Mollet de Peralada is a municipality in the comarca of Alt Empordà, Girona, Catalonia, Spain. It is split into two parts, the north-western part containing most of the population.

References

External links
Web of the town hall
 Government data pages 

Municipalities in Alt Empordà